Branchport may refer to:

Branchport, New Jersey
Branchport, New York